The Pennon of the Conquest is the flag raised by the Moors of Valencia, Spain, on September 28, 1238, on the tower of , later called , to indicate their surrender to the troops of king James I of Aragon. This episode is known from the quote entered by the king himself in his Chronicle: "We were in the riverbed, between the gardens and the tower; and when we saw our flag upon the tower, we dismounted from our horse, and heading eastwards we cried from our eyes and kissed the earth for the great mercy God had made to us".

The Pennon is made of three pieces of white cloth (which the passage of time has turned into yellowish) sewed together, cut to give the flag a torus-shaped appearance, upon which 4 red stripes have been painted. It is about 2 m long and on top an epigraph reads  ("year 1238"). After the Conquest of Valencia it was considered a relic and was kept by order of James I of Aragon in the Church at Saint Vincent Hospital up to the 19th century, when it was transferred to its current location in the City Hall of Valencia, Spain.

See also 

 Flag of Valencia
 Senyera

References 

Aragonese conquest of Valencia
History of Valencia
Flags of Spain
1238 works